Eric Watterson (born 30 June 1964) is an Australian former professional basketball player who played 11 seasons in the National Basketball League (NBL) for the Perth Wildcats.

Career
Watterson began his career with the Perth Wildcats in 1984 and was a member of their 1990 and 1991 championship winning teams.

He retired in 1994, having played 306 games for the Wildcats, the second Wildcats player after Mike Ellis to play 300 games for the club.  The Eric Watterson Medal is awarded annually by the Wildcat players to the teammate who best embodies the team's values.

References

External links
NBL stats

1964 births
Living people
Australian men's basketball players
Guards (basketball)
Perth Wildcats players